Rambo is a side-scrolling action-adventure video game produced by Pack-In-Video for the Nintendo Entertainment System (NES). It was released on December 4, 1987 in Japan, and May 1988 in North America. It is based on the film Rambo: First Blood Part II (1985). The game sold 600,000 copies.

Gameplay 
The game starts off with Colonel Trautman asking Rambo whether or not he wants to leave the prison and start the mission. Players are given a choice, but cannot advance in the game unless "yes" is chosen. Players advance through the camp and talk to others, and when talking to Trautman again, he tells Rambo the mission. Rambo then drops into the forest and fights spiders and other forest creatures. Bosses include giant spiders and helicopters. The game has similar gameplay to Zelda II: The Adventure of Link. In the Japanese version, the experience meter is replaced by an anger meter; however, it functions exactly the same.

Later in the game, Rambo picks up an arsenal of weapons and fights enemy soldiers, but this happens close to the end of the game.

The  ending sequence allows the player to throw a giant kanji character (怒, Ikari:Anger) towards Murdock after returning to the base, which inexplicably turns Murdock into a frog.

The USA version ends with a simple "End", but the Japanese Famicom version contains staff credits. It is unknown why this was left out of the USA version.

References

External links 
 

Rambo (franchise) video games
Nintendo Entertainment System games
Nintendo Entertainment System-only games
1987 video games
Video games based on films
Video games based on adaptations
Video games developed in Japan
Video games set in prison
Video games set in Vietnam
Vietnam War video games